Punta Sardegna Lighthouse is an active lighthouse located on the northern end of the granite promontory of Punta Sardegna, in front of the Maddalena archipelago, in the municipality of Palau on the Strait of Bonifacio.

History
The building and the tower are painted white, the lantern dome in grey metallic. The lighthouse was electrified in 1935 and automated in 1975 when the last keeper left; in the years 1946 and 1947 the work was carried out by a woman, Genoveffa Balzano. 
For twenty years the lighthouse remained in complete abandonment until 1995, when the structure was given, by the Marina Militare in free perpetual concession, to the Universities of Trieste and Cagliari as seat of the Coastal and Marine Geomorphology Group (OCEANS).

In 1998 an agreement was signed between the two Universities and the City of Palau and extended in 2008 to the Province of Olbia-Tempio. Renovation work was carried out by the municipality and the centre, which can accommodate up to 16 researchers, was opened on June 3, 2005.

Description
The light is completely automated, powered by a solar unit and managed by the Marina Militare with the identification code number 1030 E.F.; the building is managed by the Coastal and Marine Geomorphology Group.

See also
 List of lighthouses in Italy

References

External links

 Servizio Fari Marina Militare
 Coastal and Marine Geomorphology Group (CMGG)

Lighthouses in Italy
Buildings and structures in Sardinia